The University of Toronto Libraries system is the largest academic library in Canada and is ranked third among peer institutions in North America, behind only Harvard and Yale. The system consists of 39 libraries located on University of Toronto's three university campuses: St. George (downtown Toronto), Mississauga and Scarborough. This array of college libraries, special collections, and specialized libraries and information centres supports the teaching and research requirements of 215 graduate programs, over 60 professional programs, and more than 700 undergraduate degree programs. In addition to more than 12 million print volumes in 341 languages, the library system currently provides access to 150,467 journal titles, millions of electronic resources in various forms and almost 30,000 linear metres of archival material. More than 150,000 new print volumes are acquired each year.

The largest library in the system is the Robarts Library, which houses the main collection of social sciences and humanities research resources at the University of Toronto. The Robarts Library complex is also home to the central Libraries’ administrative offices, exhibit galleries, Scotiabank Information Commons, Centre for Teaching Support & Innovation, Cheng Yu Tung East Asian Library, Richard Charles Lee Canada-Hong Kong Library, Map & Data Library, Petro Jacyk Central & East European Resource Centre and the Media Commons. Robarts Library is only accessible to University of Toronto students, faculty, staff, and those with a valid ID card.

The Thomas Fisher Rare Book Library is connected to Robarts Library and is open to the public. It houses both the Department of Rare Books and Special Collections and the University of Toronto Archives and Records Management Services. It is Canada's largest rare book library and its holdings include books, manuscripts, maps, and graphic and audiovisual material covering a broad range of subjects and time periods.

Also located in St. George campus, the Gerstein Science Information Centre is the main library for the science and health science disciplines. In addition to the centre's comprehensive print collection, there is a vast selection of health and scientific databases and indexes available online.

Partnerships and collaboration
The University of Toronto Libraries system is a member of the Association of Research Libraries, Canadian Association of Research Libraries, and the Ontario Council of University Libraries.

Branches 
Main

 John P. Robarts Research Library 
 Gerstein Science Information Centre
U of T Mississauga Library
U of T Scarborough Library

Colleges

Emmanuel College Library
Innis College Library
 Caven Library (Knox College)
 Robertson Davies Library (Massey College)
 Ivey Library (New College)
 John M. Kelly Library (St. Michael's College)
 John W. Graham Library (Trinity College & Wycliffe College)
University College Library
 E. J. Pratt Library (Victoria College)

Subject

 Eberhard Zeidler Library (architecture)
 Astronomy and Astrophysics Library
 Department of Art Library 
 Milt Harris Library (business)
 A. D. Allen Library (chemistry)
 Criminology Information Service & Library
 Harry R. Abbott Library (dentistry)
 Noranda Earth Sciences Library
Cheng Yu Tung East Asian Library (East Asian studies)
 OISE Library (education)
 Engineering and Computer Science Library
 First Nations House Library
 Richard Charles Lee Canada-Hong Kong Library (Hong Kong studies)
 Newman Library (industrial relations and human resources)
 Bora Laskin Law Library (law)
 Mathematical Sciences Library (mathematics and the statistical sciences)
 Pontifical Institute of Mediæval Studies Library
 Music Library
 Physics Library
 Petro Jacyk Central & East European Resource Centre (Russia & East Central Europe studies)

Chief librarians 
University Librarian

John McCaul (1843-1852)
John William Small (1852-1853)
Alexander Lorimer (1854-1868)
John Edgeworth Thomson (1868-1972)
 William Henry Van der Smissen (1873-1891)
 Hugh Hornby Langton (1892-1923)
William Stewart Wallace (1923-1954)

Chief Librarian

Robert Harold Blackburn (1954-1981)
Marilyn Sharrow (1982-1985)
 Carol Moore (1986-2011)
 Larry P. Alford (2011–present)

References

External links 

University of Toronto Libraries
Blackburn, Robert H. (1989). Evolution of the heart: A history of the University of Toronto library up to 1981. Toronto: University of Toronto Library. 
Heritage University of Toronto: Our Ongoing History in Images, Text & Rich Media
The University of Toronto Archives and Record Management Services holds the archival papers of Robert H. Blackburn, the university librarian from 1958 to 1982 and the Librarians' Association of the University of Toronto (LAUT)

 
Toronto Libraries, University of
Libraries established in 1892
1892 establishments in Canada